Teribersky (masculine), Teriberskaya (feminine), or Teriberskoye (neuter) may refer to:
Teriberskaya Volost (1912–1927), an administrative division of Alexandrovsky Uyezd of Arkhangelsk Governorate, Russian Empire, and later of Murmansk Governorate of the Russian SFSR
Teribersky District (1927–1963), an administrative division of Murmansk Okrug of Leningrad Oblast of the Russian SFSR, and later of Murmansk Oblast